The Southern Open was a golf tournament on the PGA Tour from 1970 to 2002. It was played at the Green Island Country Club in Columbus, Georgia, from 1970 to 1990 and at the Callaway Gardens Resort (Mountain View Course), Pine Mountain, Georgia, from 1991 to 2002. It was founded in 1970 as the Green Island Open Invitational but was known for most of its existence as the Southern Open. The purse for the 2002 tournament was $3,700,000, with $666,000 going to the winner.

Tournament highlights
 1970: Mason Rudolph wins the inaugural version of the tournament. He finishes two shots ahead of Chris Blocker.  
 1971: Future World Golf Hall of Fame member Johnny Miller wins for the first time on the PGA Tour. He wins by five shots over Deane Beman.
 1975: Hubert Green shoots a final round 64 to win by three shots over John Schroeder.  
 1978: Jerry Pate becomes the one and only winner of the tournament to successfully defend his title. He beats Phil Hancock by one shot. 
 1981: Mike Sullivan looks poised to win back to back Southern Opens till J. C. Snead defeats him on the second hole of a sudden death playoff.
 1983: Scottish golfer Sam Torrance who had never made a cut in ten previous PGA Tour appearances, tries tuning up for the Ryder Cup matches by participating in the Southern Open. Torrance nearly wins till Ronnie Black birdies the fourth playoff hole to take home the title.
 1986: Columbus, Georgia native and Monday qualifier Fred Wadsworth wins by two shots over George Archer, John Cook, Tim Simpson, and Jim Thorpe.
 1990: Kenny Knox who was born in Columbus, Georgia and had lived there till he was sixteen, makes a birdie on the second playoff hole to defeat Jim Hallet.
 1993: The tournament has its first ever five-player playoff. John Inman makes a birdie on the second extra hole to defeat Billy Andrade, Bob Estes, Brad Bryant, and Mark Brooks.
 1996: For the second time in four years, the tournament winner is decided in a five-player playoff. Michael Bradley birdies the first hole of sudden death to beat defending champion Fred Funk, Len Mattiace, Davis Love III, and John Maginnes.
 2001: Just like in 1981 and 1996, the defending champion loses in a playoff. This time it is David Duval who loses to Chris DiMarco on the first hole of sudden death.
 2002: Jonathan Byrd shoots a final round 63 to win the final edition of the tournament. He beats David Toms by one shot.

Winners

Notes

References

External links
Tournament results from 1970 to 2002 at GolfObserver.com - Click-on a year for scores and earnings of the particular year. 
2002 Tournament preview - at GolfToday.co.uk

Former PGA Tour events
Golf in Georgia (U.S. state)
Sports in Columbus, Georgia
Recurring sporting events established in 1970
Recurring sporting events disestablished in 2002
1970 establishments in Georgia (U.S. state)
2002 disestablishments in Georgia (U.S. state)